John Davis "Brownie" Foreman (August 6, 1875 – October 10, 1926) was an American professional baseball pitcher. He played in the major leagues for the Pittsburgh Pirates and the Cincinnati Reds of the National League during 1895–1896.

In a two-season major league career, Foreman posted a 12–12 record with a 4.97 earned run average in 32 games pitched (29 starts), while registering 20 complete games, one shutout, and  innings pitched. Foreman also played several minor leagues seasons, competing in the Virginia State League in 1895, the Western League in 1897, the Canadian League in 1898, and the Eastern League in 1900.

Foreman died in his hometown of Baltimore in 1926, aged 51. His older brother, Frank Foreman (nicknamed "Monkey"), was also a major league pitcher.

Sources

External links

1875 births
1926 deaths
Cincinnati Reds players
Pittsburgh Pirates players
19th-century baseball players
Major League Baseball pitchers
Baseball players from Baltimore
Petersburg Farmers players
London Cockneys players
Norfolk Jewels players
Reading Coal Heavers players
Toronto Canucks players
Wilmington Giants players
Portsmouth Browns players